Shah Alam (born 22 September 1981, Nakha, Basti) is a social activist and documentary film maker.

He is founder of Awam Ka Cinema (People's Cinema) & Sunil Janah School of Photography at Chambal Valley.

Early life and career
Shah Alam born at Nakha, district Basti and he was an alumnus of the Dr. Ram Manohar Lohia Avadh University, Faizabad & Jamia Millia Islamia, New Delhi.
 
After completing his education he was working in TV news channels, later he founded an organisation named Awam Ka Cinema (People's Cinema) in 2006 & Sunil Janah School of Photography at Chambal Valley in 2017.

Personal life
Now, Shah Alam lives in Chambal Valley. He is currently writing a book.

See also
Awam Ka Cinema
Chambal Archives

References

External links
Awam Ka Cinema

Living people
Indian human rights activists
Indian activist journalists
Indian documentary filmmakers
Jamia Millia Islamia alumni
People from Basti
People from Uttar Pradesh
1981 births